is a two-chapter Japanese manga written and illustrated by Nobuhiro Watsuki. It is a spin-off of the main series Rurouni Kenshin. It tells the story about how Shishio Makoto met Komagata Yumi and formed the Juppongatana.

The chapters were published in Shueisha's Jump Square in July and September 2014. Shueisha collected the chapters in a single tankōbon volume. In North America, Viz Media published the chapters in their Weekly Shonen Jump digital magazine.

Plot

Publication
In January 2014, Nobuhiro Watsuki's novelist wife Kaworu Kurosaki revealed at her Otakon Vegas panel that Watsuki was preparing a spin-off manga centered about Rurouni Kenshin enemy characters. Kurosaki invited the panel's audience to suggest which characters should get the spotlight, and she would give the suggestions to Watsuki. The June 2014 issue of Shueisha's Jump Square, launched in April, reveled that the spin-off manga would be about Shishio Makoto. The July 2014 issue of Jump Square, launched in June, revealed that the manga would be about how Shishio met Komagata Yumi and formed the Juppongatana. The first part debuted in the August 2014 issue of Jump Square, released on July 4, 2014. The second part was published in the October 2014 issue of Jump Square, released on September 4, 2014. Shueisha collected the chapters in a single tankōbon volume, under the Jump Comics SQ. imprint, released on October 3, 2014. The volume also includes the story , written by Kaworu Kurosaki.

In North America, Viz Media published the chapters in English in their Weekly Shonen Jump digital magazine.

References

Rurouni Kenshin
Comics spin-offs
Historical anime and manga
Samurai in anime and manga
Shōnen manga
Shueisha manga
Viz Media manga